Michelle Sophie Gatting (born 21 December 1993 in Århus) is a racing driver from Denmark. She currently competes in the European Le Mans Series.

Racing record

Career summary

† As Gatting was aguest driver she was ineligible for a championship position.

Complete European Le Mans Series results
(key) (Races in bold indicate pole position; results in italics indicate fastest lap)

Complete TCR Denmark Touring Car Series results
(key) (Races in bold indicate pole position) (Races in italics indicate fastest lap)

†  Drivers did not finish the race, but were classified as they completed over 75% of the race distance.

Complete FIA World Endurance Championship results
(key) (Races in bold indicate pole position) (Races in italics indicate fastest lap)

* Season still in progress.

Complete 24 Hours of Le Mans results

References

External links

 Profile at Driver Database
 Official website

Danish racing drivers
1993 births
24 Hours of Le Mans drivers
Living people
Sportspeople from Aarhus
Formula Ford drivers
International GT Open drivers
FIA World Endurance Championship drivers
European Le Mans Series drivers
Asian Le Mans Series drivers
Fluid Motorsport Development drivers
Peugeot Sport drivers
Le Mans Cup drivers
Iron Lynx drivers
WeatherTech SportsCar Championship drivers
Lamborghini Super Trofeo drivers
Ferrari Challenge drivers
Porsche Carrera Cup Germany drivers
Danish female racing drivers